John M. Schlichter (June 10, 1958 - November 19, 2020) was an American politician of the Republican Party who held a seat in the Ohio House of Representatives. He was from Washington Court House, Ohio.

In 2002, Schlichter won a seat in the House of Representatives by defeating sitting incumbent Joe Sulzer. He won re-election in 2004.

In 2008, Schlichter lost to Raymond Pryor.

External links
Profile at OhioBusinessVotes.org

1958 births
Living people
Republican Party members of the Ohio House of Representatives
People from Washington Court House, Ohio
21st-century American politicians